Pappenheim is a town in the Weißenburg-Gunzenhausen district, in Bavaria, Germany. It is situated on the river Altmühl, 11 km south of Weißenburg in Bayern.

History 

Historically, Pappenheim was a statelet within Holy Roman Empire. It was mediatised to Bavaria in 1806.

Counts of Pappenheim settled at the territory, particularly Gottfried Heinrich Graf zu Pappenheim.

Sites 
 Galluskirche
 Neues Schloss Pappenheim (built by Klenze after the mediatisation of the Pappenheim state. Not open to the public)
 Altes Schloss

Notable people 
The architect and professor Eduard Mezger (1807–1894) was born in Pappenheim.

Else Pappenheim (1911-2009) and her father Martin Pappenheim (1881-1943), both were famous psychoanalysts.

References 

Jewish communities
Weißenburg-Gunzenhausen